Milan Ridge is a mainly ice-free ridge,  long, bordering the west side of Ascent Glacier in the Miller Range, Antarctica. It was named by the Advisory Committee on Antarctic Names for Frederick M. Milan, a physiologist at Little America V in 1957.

References

Ridges of Oates Land